The KNC (Kawan ng Cordero) Show (English: Flock of Lamb) is a children's television program originated in the Philippines, and based on the Bible.

It is a production of the Progressive Broadcasting Corporation and BMPI Chief Executive Officer Daniel Razon, PhD and Bro. Eli Soriano aired daily on UNTV, the country's Public Service television channel.

Awards
2008, Best Children Show at the 22nd PMPC Star Awards for Television
2011, Awardee at the 25th PMPC Star Awards for Television and Finalist in the Golden Screen TV Awards’ Outstanding Educational Program 
2012, Finalist in Quality in Children’s Television Worldwide Award and Tunay na Programang Pambata sa Telebisyon Awardee by the Department of Education (National Council for Children’s Television)
2013, Best Educational Program Finalist in the Gandingan Awards (7th UPLB Isko’t Iska’s Choice Awards)
2014, Best TV Children's Program by the Golden Dove Awards
2015, Best Children Show at the 29th PMPC Star Awards for Television

References

2000s children's television series
UNTV (Philippines) original programming
2004 Philippine television series debuts
Members Church of God International
2010s children's television series
Filipino-language television shows
English-language television shows